Sandy, West Virginia may refer to the following unincorporated communities:

Sandy, Kanawha County, West Virginia
Sandy, Monongalia County, West Virginia
Sandy, Taylor County, West Virginia

See also
Little Sandy, West Virginia, an unincorporated community in Preston County
Big Sandy, West Virginia, a census-designated place in McDowell County